Joseph Gibbons may refer to:

 Joseph Gibbons (Florida politician) (born 1948), Florida businessman and Democratic politician
 Joseph Gibbons (Toronto politician) (died 1946), municipal politician in Toronto, Canada

See also

 Joe Gibbon (1935–2019), American baseball player
 Joseph Gibbins (1888–1965), British trade unionist and politician